Abhishek Tamrakar (born 8 August 1982) is an Indian cricketer. He made his first-class debut for Chhattisgarh in the 2016–17 Ranji Trophy on 20 October 2016. He made his Twenty20 debut for Chhattisgarh in the 2016–17 Inter State Twenty-20 Tournament on 29 January 2017.

References

External links
 

1982 births
Living people
Indian cricketers
Chhattisgarh cricketers
People from Durg